The England Open  is a darts tournament that has been held annually since 1995.

List of tournaments

Men's

Women's

Youth's

Girls

Tournament records
 Most wins 3:  Ted Hankey,  Wesley Harms.
 Most Finals 5:  Ted Hankey.
 Most Semi Finals 5:  Ted Hankey.
 Most Quarter Finals 8:  Ted Hankey.
 Most Appearances 10:  Ted Hankey.
 Youngest Winner age 24:  Brian Raman.
 Oldest Winner age 45:  Mike Veitch.

References

1995 establishments in England
Darts tournaments
British Darts Organisation tournaments